Aman Doktor (Oh! Doctor) is Candan Erçetin's seventh studio album. It released in 2005, around the tenth year of the singer's public career. The album is a compilation and partial rearrangement of popular folk songs common to Turkish and Greek cultures, sung in both languages, and represents a culmination of the efforts of Erçetin as a friendship envoy to these two countries.

Track listing

References 

Candan Erçetin albums
2005 albums